Wim Hendriks (19 April 1930 – 24 March 1975) was a Dutch footballer. He played in three matches for the Netherlands national football team between 1952 and 1953.

During his active career, Hendriks played for Vitesse, De Graafschap, and KFC Koog aan de Zaan.

References

External links
 

1930 births
1975 deaths
Dutch footballers
Netherlands international footballers
Footballers from Amsterdam
Association football defenders
SBV Vitesse players
De Graafschap players